The First Party System was the political party system in the United States between roughly 1792 and 1824. It featured two national parties competing for control of the presidency, Congress, and the states:  the Federalist Party, created largely by Alexander Hamilton, and the rival Jeffersonian Democratic-Republican Party, formed by Thomas Jefferson and James Madison, usually called at the time the Republican Party (which is distinct from the modern Republican Party).

The Federalists were dominant until 1800, while the Republicans were dominant after 1800. Both parties originated in national politics, but soon expanded their efforts to gain supporters and voters in every state. The Federalists appealed to the business community and the Republicans to the planters and farmers. By 1796, politics in every state was nearly monopolized by the two parties, with party newspapers and caucuses becoming effective tools to mobilize voters.

The Federalists promoted the financial system of Treasury Secretary Hamilton, which emphasized federal assumption of state debts, a tariff to pay off those debts, a national bank to facilitate financing, and encouragement of banking and manufacturing. The Republicans, based in the plantation South, opposed strong executive power, were hostile to a standing army and navy, demanded a strict reading of the Constitutional powers of the federal government, and strongly opposed the Hamilton financial program. Perhaps even more important was foreign policy, where the Federalists favored Britain because of its political stability and its close ties to American trade, while the Republicans admired France and the French Revolution. Jefferson was especially fearful that British aristocratic influences would undermine republicanism. Britain and France were at war from 1793–1815, with only one brief interruption. Official American policy was neutrality, with the Federalists hostile to France, and the Republicans hostile to Britain. The Jay Treaty of 1794 marked the decisive mobilization of the two parties and their supporters in every state. President George Washington, while officially nonpartisan, generally supported the Federalists and that party made Washington their iconic hero.

The First Party System ended during the Era of Good Feelings (1816–1824), as the Federalists shrank to a few isolated strongholds and the Democratic-Republicans lost unity. In 1824–28, as the Second Party System emerged, the Democratic-Republican Party split into the Jacksonian faction, which became the modern Democratic Party in the 1830s, and the Henry Clay faction, which was absorbed by Clay's Whig Party.

Federalists versus Anti-Federalists in 1787–88

Leading nationalists, George Washington, Alexander Hamilton and Benjamin Franklin (see Annapolis Convention), called the Constitutional Convention in 1787.  It drew up a new constitution that was submitted to state ratification conventions for approval, with the old Congress of the Confederation also approving the process. James Madison was the most prominent figure in the Constitutional Convention; he is often referred to as "the father of the Constitution".

An intense debate on ratification pitted the "Federalists" (who supported the Constitution, and were led by Madison and Hamilton) against the "Anti-Federalists," (who opposed the new Constitution). The Federalists won and the Constitution was ratified. The Anti-Federalists were deeply concerned about the theoretical danger of a strong central government (like that of Britain) that someday could usurp the rights of the states.  The framers of the Constitution did not want or expect political parties to emerge because they considered them divisive.

The term "Federalist Party" originated around 1792–1793 and refers to a somewhat different coalition of supporters of the Constitution in 1787–1788 as well as entirely new elements, and even a few former opponents of the Constitution (such as Patrick Henry).  Madison largely wrote the Constitution and was thus a Federalist in 1787–1788, but he opposed the program of the Hamiltonians and their new "Federalist Party".

Washington administration (1789–1797)

At first, there were no parties in the nation. Factions soon formed around dominant personalities such as Alexander Hamilton, the Secretary of the Treasury, and Thomas Jefferson, the Secretary of State, who opposed Hamilton's broad vision of a powerful federal government. Jefferson especially objected to Hamilton's flexible view of the Constitution, which stretched to include a national bank. Jefferson was joined by Madison in opposing the Washington administration, leading the "Anti-Administration party". Washington was re-elected without opposition in 1792.

Hamilton built a national network of supporters that emerged about 1792–93 as the Federalist Party. In response, Jefferson and James Madison built a network of supporters of the republic in Congress and in the states that emerged in 1792–93 as the Democratic-Republican Party. The elections of 1792 were the first contested on anything resembling a partisan basis. In most states, the congressional elections were recognized in some sense, as Jefferson strategist John Beckley put it, as a "struggle between the Treasury department and the republican interest". In New York, the race for governor was organized along these lines. The candidates were John Jay, who was a Hamiltonian, and incumbent George Clinton, who was allied with Jefferson and the Republicans.

In 1793, the first Democratic-Republican Societies were formed. They supported the French Revolution, which had just seen the execution of King Louis XVI, and generally supported the Jeffersonian cause. The word "democrat" was proposed by Citizen Genêt for the societies, and the Federalists ridiculed Jefferson's friends as "democrats". After Washington denounced the societies as unrepublican, they mostly faded away.

In 1793, war broke out between England, France, and their European allies. The Jeffersonians favored France and pointed to the 1778 treaty that was still in effect. Washington and his unanimous cabinet (including Jefferson) decided the treaty did not bind the U.S. to enter the war; instead Washington proclaimed neutrality.

When war threatened with Britain in 1794, Washington sent John Jay to negotiate the Jay Treaty with Britain; it was signed in late 1794, and ratified in 1795. It averted a possible war and settled many (but not all) of the outstanding issues between the U.S. and Britain. The Jeffersonians vehemently denounced the treaty, saying it threatened to undermine republicanism by giving the aristocratic British and their Federalist allies too much influence. The fierce debates over the Jay Treaty in 1794–96, according to William Nisbet Chambers, nationalized politics and turned a faction in Congress into a nationwide party. To fight the treaty the Jeffersonians "established coordination in activity between leaders at the capital, and leaders, actives and popular followings in the states, counties and towns".

In 1796 Jefferson challenged John Adams for the presidency and lost. The Electoral College made the decision, and it was largely chosen by the state legislatures, many of which were not chosen on a national party basis.

Newspapers as party weapons
By 1796, both parties had a national network of newspapers, which attacked each other vehemently. The Federalist and Republican newspapers of the 1790s traded vicious barbs against their enemies. An example is this acrostic from a Republican paper, where the first letter of each line spells the name of Federalist leader Alexander Hamilton:

The most heated rhetoric came in debates over the French Revolution, especially during the Reign of Terror of 1793–94, which saw huge numbers of executions of the revolutionary government's political opponents. Nationalism was a high priority, and the editors fostered an intellectual nationalism typified by the Federalist effort to stimulate a national literary culture through their clubs and publications in New York and Philadelphia, and through Federalist Noah Webster's efforts to simplify and Americanize the language.

Party strength in Congress
Historians have used statistical techniques to estimate the party breakdown in Congress. Many Congressmen were hard to classify in the first few years, but after 1796 there was less uncertainty. The first parties were anti-federalist and federalist.

Inventing campaign techniques
Given the power of the Federalists, the Democratic Republicans had to work harder to win. In Connecticut in 1806 the state leadership sent town leaders instructions for the forthcoming elections; every town manager was told by state leaders "to appoint a district manager in each district or section of his town, obtaining from each an assurance that he will faithfully do his duty".  Then the town manager was instructed to compile lists and total up the number of taxpayers, the number of eligible voters, how many were "decided democratic republicans," "decided federalists," or "doubtful," and finally to count the number of supporters who were not currently eligible to vote but who might qualify (by age or taxes) at the next election.  The returns eventually went to the state manager, who issued directions to laggard towns to get all the eligibles to town meetings, help the young men qualify to vote, to nominate a full ticket for local elections, and to print and distribute the party ticket. (The secret ballot did not appear for a century.)  This highly coordinated "get-out-the-vote" drive would be familiar to modern political campaigners, but was the first of its kind in world history.

The Jeffersonians invented many campaign techniques that the Federalists later adopted and that became standard American practice. They were especially effective at building a network of newspapers in major cities to broadcast their statements and editorialize in their favor. But the Federalists, with a strong base among merchants, controlled more newspapers: in 1796 the Federalist papers outnumbered the Democratic Republicans by 4 to 1.  Every year more papers began publishing; in 1800 the Federalists still had a 2 to 1 numerical advantage.  Most papers, on each side, were weeklies with a circulation of 300 to 1000. Jefferson systematically subsidized the editors. Fisher Ames, a leading Federalist, who used the term "Jacobin" to link Jefferson's followers to the terrorists of the French Revolution, blamed the newspapers for electing Jefferson, seeing them as "an overmatch for any Government ... The Jacobins owe their triumph to the unceasing use of this engine; not so much to skill in use of it as by repetition." Historians echo Ames' assessment.  As one explains,
It was the good fortune of the Republicans to have within their ranks a number of highly gifted political manipulators and propagandists. Some of them had the ability ... to not only see and analyze the problem at hand but to present it in a succinct fashion; in short, to fabricate the apt phrase, to coin the compelling slogan and appeal to the electorate on any given issue in language it could understand.

Outstanding phrasemakers included editor William Duane, party leaders Albert Gallatin and Thomas Cooper, and Jefferson himself. Meanwhile, John J. Beckley of Pennsylvania, an ardent partisan, invented new campaign techniques (such as mass distribution of pamphlets and of handwritten ballots) that generated the grass-roots support and unprecedented levels of voter turnout for the Jeffersonians.

War threats with Britain and France
With the world thrown into global warfare after 1793, the small nation on the fringe of the European system could barely remain neutral. The Jeffersonians called for strong measures against Britain, and even for another war. The Federalists tried to avert war by the Jay Treaty (1795) with England. The treaty became highly controversial when the Jeffersonians denounced it as a sell-out to Britain, even as the Federalists said it avoided war, reduced the Indian threat, created good trade relations with the world's foremost economic power, and ended lingering disputes from the Revolutionary War. When Jefferson came to power in 1801 he honored the treaty, but new disputes with Britain led to the War of 1812.

In 1798 disputes with France led to the Quasi-War (1798–1800), an undeclared naval war involving the navies and merchant ships of both countries. Democratic-Republicans said France really wanted peace, but the XYZ Affair undercut their position. Warning that full-scale war with France was imminent, Hamilton and his "High Federalist" allies forced the issue by getting Congressional approval to raise a large new army (which Hamilton controlled), replete with officers' commissions (which he bestowed on his partisans). The Alien and Sedition Acts (1798) clamped down on dissenters, including pro-Jefferson editors, and Vermont Congressman Matthew Lyon, who won re-election while in jail in 1798.  In the Kentucky and Virginia Resolutions (1798), secretly drafted by Madison and Jefferson, the legislatures of the two states challenged the power of the federal government.

National debt
Jefferson and Albert Gallatin focused on the danger that the public debt, unless it was paid off, would be a threat to republican values. They were appalled that Hamilton was increasing the national debt and using it to solidify his Federalist base.  Gallatin was the Republican Party's chief expert on fiscal issues and as Treasury Secretary under Jefferson and Madison worked hard to lower taxes and lower the debt, while at the same time paying cash for the Louisiana Purchase and funding the War of 1812.  Burrows says of Gallatin:

Andrew Jackson saw the national debt as a "national curse" and he took special pride in paying off the entire national debt in 1835.

Jefferson and the revolution of 1800
In an analysis of the contemporary party system, Jefferson wrote on February 12, 1798:

Madison worked diligently to form party lines inside the Congress and build coalitions with sympathetic political factions in each state. In 1800, a critical election galvanized the electorate, sweeping the Federalists out of power, and electing Jefferson and his Democratic-Republican Party. Adams made a few last minute, "midnight appointments", notably Federalist John Marshall as Chief Justice. Marshall held the post for three decades and used it to federalize the Constitution, much to Jefferson's dismay.

As president, Jefferson worked to cleanse the government of Adams's "midnight appointments", withholding the commissions of 25 of 42 appointed judges and removing army officers. The sense that the nation needed two rival parties to balance each other had not been fully accepted by either party; Hamilton had viewed Jefferson's election as the failure of the Federalist experiment. The rhetoric of the day was cataclysmic — election of the opposition meant the enemy would ruin the nation. Jefferson's foreign policy was not exactly pro-Napoleon, but it applied pressure on Britain to stop impressment of American sailors and other hostile acts. By engineering an embargo of trade against Britain, Jefferson and Madison plunged the nation into economic depression, ruined much of the business of Federalist New England, and finally precipitated the War of 1812 with a much larger and more powerful foe.

The Federalists vigorously criticized the government, and gained strength in the industrial Northeast. However, they committed a major blunder in 1814. That year the semi-secret "Hartford Convention" passed resolutions that verged on secession; their publication ruined the Federalist party. It had been limping along for years, with strength in New England and scattered eastern states but practically no strength in the West. While Federalists helped invent or develop numerous campaign techniques (such as the first national nominating conventions in 1808), their elitist bias alienated the middle class, thus allowing the Jeffersonians to claim they represented the true spirit of "republicanism".

State parties
Because of the importance of foreign policy (decided by the national government), of the sale of national lands, and the patronage controlled by the President, the factions in each state realigned themselves in parallel with the Federalists and Republicans. Some newspaper editors became powerful politicians, such as Thomas Ritchie, whose "Richmond Junto" controlled Virginia state politics from 1808 into the 1840s.

New England was always the stronghold of the Federalist party. One historian explains how well organized it was in Connecticut:

Religious tensions polarized Connecticut, as the established Congregational Church, in alliance with the Federalists, tried to maintain its grip on power.  Dissenting groups moved toward the Jeffersonians. The failure of the Hartford Convention in 1814 wounded the Federalists, who were finally upended by the Democratic-Republicans in 1817.

Era of Good Feelings
The First Party System was primarily built around foreign policy issues that vanished with the defeat of Napoleon and the compromise settlement of the War of 1812. Furthermore, the fears that Federalists were plotting to reintroduce aristocracy dissipated. Thus an "Era of Good Feelings" under James Monroe replaced the high-tension politics of the First Party System about 1816. Personal politics and factional disputes were occasionally still hotly debated, but Americans no longer thought of themselves in terms of political parties.

Historians have debated the exact ending of the system. Most concluded it petered out by 1820. The little state of Delaware, largely isolated from the larger political forces controlling the nation, saw the First Party System continue well into the 1820s, with the Federalists occasionally winning some offices.

Historiography

Legitimacy of a party system

Alexander Hamilton felt that only by mobilizing its supporters on a daily basis in every state on many issues could support for the government be sustained through thick and thin. Newspapers were needed to communicate inside the party; patronage helped the party's leaders and made new friends.

Hamilton, and especially Washington, distrusted the idea of an opposition party, as shown in George Washington's Farewell Address of 1796.  They thought opposition parties would only weaken the nation. By contrast Jefferson was the main force behind the creation and continuity of an opposition party.  He deeply felt the Federalists represented aristocratic forces hostile to true republicanism and the true will of the people, as he explained in a letter to Henry Lee in 1824:

Hofstadter (1970) shows it took many years for the idea to take hold that having two parties is better than having one, or none. That transition was made possible by the successful passing of power in 1801 from one party to the other.  Although Jefferson systematically identified Federalist army officers and officeholders, he was blocked from removing all of them by protests from Republicans. The Quids complained he did not go far enough.

Jefferson and Hamilton
Well into the 20th century Jefferson was the hero for scholars, and Hamilton the villain. <Ref> Image of Jefferson</ref> Jefferson's reputation has declined sharply, primarily because of his role as a major slaveowner.  Hamilton has risen; Princeton historian Sean Wilentz in 2010 identified a scholarly trend very much in Hamilton's favor—although Wilentz himself dissented and still admires Jefferson more:
In recent years, Hamilton and his reputation have decidedly gained the initiative among scholars who portray him as the visionary architect of the modern liberal capitalist economy and of a dynamic federal government headed by an energetic executive. Jefferson and his allies, by contrast, have come across as naïve, dreamy idealists. At best according to many historians, the Jeffersonians were reactionary utopians who resisted the onrush of capitalist modernity in hopes of turning America into a yeoman farmers' arcadia. At worst, they were proslavery racists who wish to rid the West of Indians, expand the empire of slavery, and keep political power in local hands – all the better to expand the institution of slavery and protect slaveholders' rights to own human property."

See also
 Federalist Era
 Party systems in the United States
 List of United States House of Representatives elections (1789–1822)
 American election campaigns in the 19th century
 History of the United States (1789–1849)

References

Further reading

General

 Banning, Lance. The Jeffersonian Persuasion: Evolution of a Party Ideology (1978) online
 Ben-Atar, Doron and Barbara B. Oberg, eds. Federalists Reconsidered (1999), topical essays by scholars
 Beard, Charles A. The Economic Origins of Jeffersonian Democracy (1915)
 Bowling, Kenneth R.  and Donald R. Kennon, eds. Perspectives on the History of Congress, 1789–1801. (2000)
 Brooke, John L. "The Early Republic, 1789–1815." in The Oxford Handbook of American Political History (Oxford University Press, USA, 2020). 45-61.

 Brown, Roger H. The Republic in Peril: 1812 (1964), stresses intense hostility between partisans
 Brown, Stuart Gerry. The First Republicans: Political Philosophy and Public Policy in the Party of Jefferson and Madison Syracuse University Press. (1954) 
 Buel, Richard. Securing the Revolution: Ideology in American Politics, 1789–1815 (1972)
 Chambers, William Nisbet, ed. The First Party System (1972) online
 Chambers, William Nisbet. Political Parties in a New Nation: The American Experience, 1776–1809 (1963), political science perspective onlibe
 Charles, Joseph. The Origins of the American Party System (1956), reprints articles in William and Mary Quarterly Cunningham, Noble E., Jr. Jeffersonian Republicans: The Formation of Party Organization: 1789–1801 (1957), highly detailed party history
 Cunningham, Noble E., Jr. The Jeffersonian Republicans in Power: Party Operations 1801–1809 (1963), highly detailed party history
 Cunningham, Noble E., Jr. The Process of Government Under Jefferson (1978)
 Dawson, Matthew Q. Partisanship and the Birth of America's Second Party, 1796–1800: Stop the Wheels of Government. Greenwood, (2000) 
 Dinkin, Robert J. Campaigning in America: A History of Election Practices. (Greenwood 1989)
 Dougherty, Keith L. "TRENDS: Creating Parties in Congress: The Emergence of a Social Network." Political Research Quarterly 73.4 (2020): 759-773. online

 Elkins, Stanley and Eric McKitrick. The Age of Federalism (1995) the standard highly detailed political history of 1790s; online free to borrow
 Ferling, John; A Leap in the Dark: The Struggle to Create the American Republic. Oxford University Press. (2003); survey 
 Finkelman, Paul, ed. Encyclopedia of the New American Nation, 1754–1829  (2005), 1600 pp.
Fischer, David Hackett. The Revolution of American Conservatism: The Federalist Party in the Era of Jeffersonian Democracy (1965), shows that the upper class Federalists learned too late how to appeal to voters
  Freeman, Joanne B. "The Election of 1800: A Study in the Logic of Political Change." Yale Law Journal. Volume: 108. Issue: 8. 1999. pp : 1959–1994.
 Goodman, Paul. "The First American Party System" in William Nisbet Chambers and Walter Dean Burnham, eds. The American Party Systems: Stages of Political Development (1967), 56–89.
 Hoadley, John F. "The Emergence of Political Parties in Congress, 1789–1803." American Political Science Review (1980) 74(3): 757–779. in JSTOR Looks at the agreement among members of Congress in their roll-call voting records. Multidimensional scaling shows the increased clustering of congressmen into two party blocs from 1789 to 1803, especially after the Jay Treaty debate; shows politics was moving away from sectionalism to organized parties.
 Hofstadter, Richard. The Idea of a Party System: The Rise of Legitimate Opposition in the United States, 1780–1840 (1970)
 Kerber, Linda K. Federalists in Dissent: Imagery and ideology in Jeffersonian America (1970)
 Lampi, Philip J. "The Federalist Party Resurgence, 1808–1816: Evidence from the New Nation Votes Database," Journal of the Early Republic (Summer 2013) 33#2 pp. 255–281 | DOI: 10.1353/jer.2013.0029
 Libby, O. G. "Political Factions in Washington's Administration," NDQ: North Dakota Quarterly (1913) vol 3#3 pp 293–318 full text online, looks at votes of each Congressman
  Luetscher, George D. Early Political Machinery in the United States (1903) online
  Miller, John C. The Federalist Era: 1789–1801 (1960), survey of political history online
 Pasley, Jeffrey L.  et al. eds. Beyond the Founders: New Approaches to the Political History of the Early American Republic (2004), topical essays by scholars
  Ratcliffe, Donald. "The Right to Vote and the Rise of Democracy, 1787–1828," Journal of the Early Republic (Summer 2013) 33#2 pp. 219–254 | DOI: 10.1353/jer.2013.0033
 Schlesinger, Arthur, Jr., ed. History of American Presidential Elections, 1789–2008 (2011) 3 vol and 11 vol editions; detailed analysis of each election, with primary documents;  online v. 1. 1789–1824 – v. 2. 1824–1844 – v. 3. 1848–1868 – v. 4. 1872–1888 – v. 5. 1892–1908 – v. 6. 1912–1924 – v. 7. 1928–1940 – v. 8. 1944–1956 – v. 9. 1960–1968 – v. 10. 1972–1984 – v. 11. 1988–2001

 Selinger, Jeffrey S. "The French Revolutionary Wars and the Ordeal of America’s First Party System." in Embracing Dissent (U of Pennsylvania Press, 2016) pp. 54-82.
 Sharp, James Roger. American Politics in the Early Republic: The New Nation in Crisis (1993), political narrative of 1790s
 Slez, Adam, and John Levi Martin. "Political Action and Party Formation in the United States Constitutional Convention," American Sociological Review,  volume 72, Number 1,  February 2007, pp. 42–67(26), says decisions in 1787 convention set up the outlines of the first party system
 Smelser, Marshall. The Democratic Republic, 1801–1815 (1968) survey of political and diplomatic history
 Theriault, Sean M.  "Party Politics during the Louisiana Purchase," Social Science History 2006 30(2):293–324; 
 Wilentz, Sean. The Rise of American Democracy: Jefferson to Lincoln. (2005), broad-scale interpretation of political history
 Wiltse, Charles Maurice. The Jeffersonian Tradition in American Democracy (1935)
 Wood, Gordon S. Empire of Liberty: A History of the Early Republic, 1789–1815 (2009)

Biographies

 Banning, Lance. The Sacred Fire of Liberty: James Madison and the Founding of the Federal Republic (1995), to 1795; 
 Cunningham, Noble E., Jr., "John Beckley: An Early American Party Manager," William and Mary Quarterly, 13 (January 1956), 40–52, in JSTOR

 Cunningham, Noble E. In pursuit of reason: the life of Thomas Jefferson (1987) online

 Malone, Dumas. Jefferson and the Ordeal of Liberty v 3();   Jefferson the President: First Term 1801 – 1805 vol 4; Jefferson the President: Second term, 1805–1809 vol 5 (1948–70), the standard multivolume biography
  Miller, John C. Alexander Hamilton: Portrait in Paradox (1959), full scale biography.
 Schachner, Nathan. Aaron Burr: A Biography (1961), full scale biography.

Newspapers and authors

 Humphrey, Carol Sue The Press of the Young Republic, 1783–1833 (1996)
 Knudson, Jerry W. Jefferson and the Press: Crucible of Liberty (2006) how 4 Republican and 4 Federalist papers covered election of 1800; Thomas Paine; Louisiana Purchase; Hamilton–Burr duel; impeachment of Chase; and the embargo
Daniel, Marcus, "Scandal and Civility: Journalism and the Birth of American Democracy" (2009)
O'Donnell, Catherine. "Literature and Politics in the Early Republic: Views from the Bridge," Journal of the Early Republic, Summer 2010, Vol. 30#2 pp 279–292; looks at Washington Irving, James Fenimore Cooper, and John Adams in terms of gender studies, interdisciplinary studies, American identity, and the work of Jürgen Habermas, Gordon Wood and Bernard Bailyn.
 Pasley, Jeffrey L. "The Tyranny of Printers": Newspaper Politics in the Early American Republic (2003)
 Rollins, Richard. The Long Journey of Noah Webster (1980); Webster was an important Federalist editor
 Stewart, Donald H. The Opposition Press of the Federalist Era (1968), highly detailed study of Republican newspapers

State and regional studies

 Banner, James M. To the Hartford Convention: The Federalists and the Origins of Party Politics in Massachusetts, 1789–1815 (1970).
 Bohmer, David A. "The Maryland Electorate and the Concept of a Party System in the Early National Period." in The History of American Electoral Behavior (Princeton University Press, 2015) pp. 146-173.

 Broussard, James H. The Southern Federalists: 1800–1816 (1978)
 Formisano, Ronald. The Transformation of Political Culture: Massachusetts Parties, 1790s–1840s (1983)
 Fox, Dixon Ryan. The decline of aristocracy in the politics of New York (1919) shows the Federalists were too artistocratic to win elections online edition
 Goodman, Paul. The Democratic-Republicans of Massachusetts: Politics in a Young Republic (1964)
 Leonard, Gerald. The Invention of Party Politics: Federalism, Popular Sovereignty, and Constitutional Development in Jacksonian Illinois (2002)
 McCormick, Richard P. The Second Party System: Party Formation in the Jacksonian Era (1966)  deals with the collapse of the First Party System, state by state
 Prince, Carl E. New	Jersey's Jeffersonian Republicans: The Genesis of an Early Party Machine, 1789–1817 (1967)
 Ridgway, Whitman H. "Community Leadership: Baltimore During the First and Second Party Systems." in Politics and Government (Routledge, 2020) pp. 70-84.

 Risjord, Norman K. The Old Republicans: Southern Conservatism in the Age of Jefferson (1965)
 Risjord; Norman K. Chesapeake Politics, 1781–1800 (1978), covers Maryland, Virginia and North Carolina
 Robertson, Andrew W. "Reconceptualizing Jeffersonian Democracy," Journal of the Early Republic (Summer 2013) 33#2 pp 317–35; focus on historiography of turnout in states and localities.
 Tinkcom, Harry M. The Republicans and Federalists in Pennsylvania, 1790–1801: A Study in National Stimulus and Local Response (1950)
 Turner, Lynn Warren; The Ninth State: New Hampshire's Formative Years. (1983).
 Young, Alfred F. The Democratic Republicans of New York: The Origins, 1763–1797 (1967)

Primary sources

 Cunningham, Noble E., Jr. ed. The Making of the American Party System 1789 to 1809 (1965), short excerpts from primary sources
 Cunningham, Noble E., Jr., ed. Circular Letters of Congressmen to Their Constituents 1789–1829'' (1978), 3 vol; political reports sent by Congressmen to local newspapers

External links
 American Political History Online  guide to WWW resources
 "The First American Party System" lesson plan for grades 9–12
A New Nation Votes: American Election Returns, 1787–1825

Political history of the United States
1790s in the United States
1800s in the United States
1810s in the United States
1820s in the United States